The 2014 Korea Open was a women's professional tennis tournament played on hard courts. It was the 11th edition of the tournament, which was part of the 2014 WTA Tour. It took place in Seoul, South Korea between 13 and 21 September 2014.

Points and prize money

Point distribution

Prize money

1 Qualifiers prize money is also the Round of 32 prize money
* per team

Singles main-draw entrants

Seeds 

 1 Rankings are as of September 8, 2014

Other entrants 

The following players received wildcards into the singles main draw:
  Jang Su-jeong
  Han Na-lae
  Maria Kirilenko

The following players received entry from the qualifying draw:
  Nicole Gibbs  
  Danka Kovinić
  Elizaveta Kulichkova
  Mandy Minella

Withdrawals 
Before the tournament
  Petra Cetkovská → replaced by  Julia Glushko
  Ekaterina Makarova → replaced by  Kristýna Plíšková
  Elena Vesnina → replaced by  Lara Arruabarrena

Retirements 
  Magdaléna Rybáriková (left hip injury)

Doubles main-draw entrants

Seeds 

1 Rankings are as of September 8, 2014

Retirements
  Maria Kirilenko (left abdominal strain)

Finals

Singles 

 Karolína Plíšková defeated  Varvara Lepchenko, 6–3, 6–7(5–7), 6–2

Doubles 

 Lara Arruabarrena /  Irina-Camelia Begu defeated  Mona Barthel /  Mandy Minella, 6–3, 6–3

References 
Singles, Doubles, and Qualifying Singles Draws

External links 
 

Korea Open
Korea Open (tennis)
Korea Open
September 2014 sports events in South Korea